Franklin Point is a conspicuous rock point forming the west end of Intercurrence Island, in the Palmer Archipelago. It was first roughly charted and named "Cape Franklin" by Henry Foster in 1829.

References

Headlands of the Palmer Archipelago